Ranbezolid (RBx7644) is an oxazolidinone antibacterial. It competitively inhibits monoamine oxidase-A (MAO-A).

References

Nitrofurans
Fluoroarenes
Oxazolidinone antibiotics
Phenylpiperazines
Reversible inhibitors of MAO-A